Wadi Barada is a river valley in southwestern Syria. The valley is home to 17 villages and towns.

Etymology 
The word wadi means valley in Arabic. "Barada" is thought to be derived from the word barid, which means "cold" in Semitic languages.
The ancient Greek name (Greek: , translit. Chrysorrhoas, means "streaming with gold"). The river has also suffered from severe drought in the last decades, mainly due to the lower rainfall rates and the large increase in the population in the area.

Geography
Wadi Barada is located in the north-western part of the Syrian capital of Damascus, in the Qalamoun district. It is known for being a mountainous area and in direct contact with the eastern mountain range of Lebanon.
The Barada River is located in the western suburb of Damascus, it is 84 km long, stems from Zabadani, and drains in Al Otaiba Lake.
The region also has a main water source. The water of Ein Fajja in the Barada valley is a major source of the capital, providing drinking water to more than six million people in Damascus and its countryside.

Villages and towns of Wadi Barada 
The following villages and towns make up Wadi Barada. The population numbers are according to the Central Bureau of Statistics (CBS) for 2004.

Syrian civil war

Syrian rebels captured the village of Ain al-Fijah in February 2012. Engineers and technicians who worked at the water spring remained in place. After the rebel capture of Wadi Barada, government forces imposed a blockade on the villages.  The army retook control of the town on 28 January 2017 and the next day the Army took full control of Wadi Barada.

See also
Barada

References 

Barada
Populated places in An-Nabek District